National Highway 948 (previously designated NH 209), is a highway in India which connects Coimbatore in Tamil Nadu with the city of Bengaluru. It is a spur road of National Highway 48. It passes through Sathyamangalam Wildlife Sanctuary. The road through wildlife sanctuary is single carriage two lane and is narrow at many places. Wild animals can be spotted in this route.

Route

Junctions  
 
  Terminal near Bengaluru.
  Terminal near Kanakapura
  near Kollegal
  near Chamrajnagar
  Terminal near Coimbatore.

See also 
 List of National Highways in India by highway number
 List of National Highways in India by state

References

External links 

 NH 948 on OpenStreetMap

National highways in India
National Highways in Tamil Nadu
National Highways in Karnataka